Michincha is a stratovolcano on the border of Bolivia and Chile. It is part of an east–west trending ridge of stratovolcanoes. To its east lies Olca. The only historical activity from the complex was a flank eruption from 1865 to 1867.

Sources

Stratovolcanoes of Chile
Subduction volcanoes
Volcanoes of Potosí Department
Mountains of Chile
Polygenetic volcanoes
Bolivia–Chile border
International mountains of South America
Volcanoes of Tarapacá Region
Holocene stratovolcanoes